In the early spring of 1981 in Poland, during the Bydgoszcz events, several members of the Solidarity movement, including Jan Rulewski, Mariusz Łabentowicz and Roman Bartoszcze, were brutally beaten by the security services, such as Milicja Obywatelska and ZOMO. The Bydgoszcz events soon became widely known across Poland, and on 24 March 1981 Solidarity decided to go on a nationwide strike in protest against the violence. The strike was planned for Tuesday, 31 March 1981. On 25 March, Lech Wałęsa met Deputy Prime Minister Mieczysław Rakowski of the Polish United Workers' Party, but their talks were fruitless. Two days later, a four-hour national warning strike took place. It was the biggest strike in the history of not only Poland but of the Warsaw Pact itself. According to several sources, between 12 million and 14 million Poles took part.

Background 
After the Bydgoszcz events, millions of Poles reacted angrily to the brutal beatings of the members of Solidarity. The atmosphere in the country grew even more tense when the government of the Polish People's Republic denied any wrongdoings, stating that the security services were simply doing their duty to restore order and the information on the beatings was described as "claims by Solidarity sources". The mass-media claimed that Jan Rulewski, one of the beaten activists, had been hurt in a car accident, not as a result of the intervention of the police. Furthermore, in early spring of 1981, the Soviet Army was carrying out huge military exercises named Soyuz 81, which were taking place in Poland. The manoeuvres were regarded by many Poles as the preparation of a Soviet invasion of their country and Marshall Viktor Kulikov, Commander-in-chief of the Warsaw Pact, told Polish general staff that despite the political situation, the exercises would continue indefinitely. In Washington, the situation in Poland was described as "political tension at its highest level since last November". Soviet military exercises continued until 7 April.

Meanwhile, leaders of Solidarity gathered at the meeting of the National Coordinating Commission (Krajowa Komisja Porozumiewawcza); they ordered all regional offices of the organisation to stay alert and be prepared for a national strike. On 21 March in Bydgoszcz, a two-hour warning strike took place; in a special communique, Solidarity announced that the Bydgoszcz events were a provocation, aimed at the government of Prime Minister Wojciech Jaruzelski. The government responded by sending to Bydgoszcz a special commission, headed by General Jozef Zyto, Deputy Prosecutor-General, whose task was to clear up the situation and determine who was guilty of the beatings of the Solidarity activists. However, its members were not interested in fulfilling their task and their inactivity was criticized by Solidarity. Opposition activists were personally insulted by the Bydgoszcz events, thinking that if the beatings could happen to Jan Rulewski, they could happen to any of them. A statement of the Polish United Workers' Party did not improve the situation, as it characterised the Bydgoszcz events as a "flagrant violation of law, which created new tensions".
 
Most members of Solidarity's National Coordinating Commission (NCC) were in favour of an all-national, general strike, which would completely paralyse the country until all details of the Bydgoszcz events had been explained and those guilty punished. Few were against such action, such as Bronisław Geremek, who said that the decision for an unlimited general strike would be a decision for a national insurrection. Finally, during the 23 March 1981 meeting in Bydgoszcz, the majority of the members of the National Coordinating Commission voted in favour of the moderate proposal, suggested by Lech Wałęsa. According to this proposal, a four-hour national warning strike would take place on Friday, 27 March 1981 between 8 a.m. and 12 pm. Wałęsa's proposal was accepted only after a heated all-night session, during which the Solidarity leader threatened to walk out. On 22 March during the service transmitted by the Polish Radio, Bishop Stefan Wyszyński appealed both to the government and Solidarity to "work out mutual rights and duties"; he also mentioned several times the danger of a "foreign factor". On 26 March, Wyszyński personally talked with General Jaruzelski; two days later, he met Wałęsa and other Solidarity activists.

The demands of the opposition were:
 The immediate punishment or suspension of officials considered responsible for the Bydgoszcz incident;
 Permission for the peasants to form their own union: Rural Solidarity;
 Security for union members and activists in their activities and the unions' right of reply to any criticism of their work (this right is to be exercised through the media);
 Annulment of a government directive giving only half pay to strikers;
 The closure of all pending cases against people arrested for political opposition to government policies between 1976 and 1980, "even if in the light of existing laws their activities constituted offenses."

If no agreement between the government and Solidarity had been reached, the general strike was planned for Tuesday, 31 March. In between, a meeting between representatives of the NCC, headed by Wałęsa, and members of the Council of Ministers' Committee for Trade Unions, headed by Deputy Prime Minister Mieczysław Rakowski took place in Warsaw, but it ended without agreement. During this meeting, a Solidarity activist from Szczecin yelled at Rakowski: "What if your wife cheats on you once, twice, three times? Will you trust her? And we do not trust you any longer".

Strike 
Timothy Garton Ash, who was in Poland at that time, wrote that Solidarity's mobilisation of its members was swift and effective, making it "the most impressive democratic mass mobilisation of any modern European society in peacetime, against its rulers' wishes". In his opinion, Poland looked like a country going to war, with national red and white flags everywhere, and the women making red and white armbands for men who were to guard the occupied factories. The National Strike Committee was established in Gdańsk, in the cradle of Solidaritythe Lenin Shipyard. Its members were Lech Wałęsa, Andrzej Gwiazda, Zbigniew Bujak, Andrzej Cierniewski, Lech Dymarski, Krzysztof Gotowski, Marian Jurczyk, Ryszard Kalinowski, Antoni Kopczewski, Bogdan Lis and Andrzej Słowik.

Soon came three Solidarity's instructions to the workers: 
 In case of a General Strike. It specified a countrywide occupation-strike, where worker guards would be on a 24-hour watch, forbidding possession or consumption of any alcoholic beverages;
 In case of a State of Emergency. It specified steps to be taken in case of militarisation of factories, urging the formations of shadow strike committees;
 In case of a Foreign Intervention. It suggested possible means of passive resistance to foreign troops in case of an invasion.

Apart from the National Strike Committee, several Interfactory Founding Committees (MKZ) were created in major cities. For security reasons, these offices were moved to large factories for the time of the strike, no matter how long it was planned to be. Therefore:
 Białystok Committee was placed in the Factory of Instruments and Handles in Białystok located then in 3 Łąkowa street,
 Katowice Committee was placed in the Baildon Steelworks in Katowice,
 Kraków Committee was placed in the Vladimir Lenin Steel Works in Nowa Huta,
 Łódź Committee was placed in the Julian Marchlewski Cotton Plant in Łódź,
 Lublin Committee was placed in the Automotive Factory in Lublin,
 Opole Committee was placed in the Frotex Factory in Prudnik,
 Poznań Committee was placed in the Cegielski Factory in Poznań,
 Przemyśl Committee was placed in the Plywood Factory in Przemyśl,
 Rzeszów Committee was placed in the Communications Equipment Factory in Rzeszów,
 Sandomierz Land Committee was placed in the Steel Works in Stalowa Wola,
 Szczecin Committee was placed in the Szczecin Shipyard,
 Warsaw Committee was placed in the Ursus Factory in Warsaw,
 Wrocław Committee was placed in the joined factories of Pafawag and Dolmel in Wrocław.

The preparations of the strike reflected an unprecedented level of planning, and in effect, worker fortresses were created across poland, patrolled by round-the-clock guards and the strike itself is until today regarded as the biggest organisational success of Solidarity, with virtually all working people of Poland participating in it. Historians from the Institute of National Remembrance claim that in late March 1981, Solidarity was at the "peak of its popularity", and this fact was reflected on Friday, 27 March 1981. The strike itself took place "in an atmosphere of calm, order, and dignity."

Even though virtually all Polish workers took part in it, basic services and crucial industrial plants, such as steelworks and armament factories, were operating without breaks. Nevertheless, Solidarity announced that these plants would go on strike as well in the event of armed intervention. Almost all schools, universities and colleges joined the strike, as well as public television (at the time, there were no private television stations in Poland). Television screens in Poland showed during the four hours of protest the words "Solidarity-Strike" and the whole country was brought to a halt. Those who had to keep working, like employees of hospitals, put on white–red armbands, to express their solidarity.

Aftermath 
After four hours, at midday, the sirens across the country sounded and Poland went back to work. The size of the strike shocked the leadership of the Polish United Workers' Party, especially when it turned out that members of the party had widely participated (at that time, Solidarity had some 9 million members, but 12–14 million people took part in the strike). Meanwhile, Lech Wałęsa's advisors, such as Tadeusz Mazowiecki and Bronisław Geremek, told the leader of Solidarity that the general strike, planned for 30 March, would mean civil war and the risk was too high. Diplomats from Western countries were also aware of the tense situation in Poland; therefore, military attaches from the United Kingdom, the United States and West Germany were ordered not to leave Poland. In case of a Soviet invasion of Poland, the Americans were planning a military blockade of Cuba.

On 30 March 1981, the government of Poland reached an agreement with Solidarity. The government of Poland conceded to demands regarding police brutality but the agreement to legalise Rural Solidarity was postponed, as well as further steps on the issue of political prisoners. The government acknowledged its mishandling of the Bydgoszcz events, and in return, Lech Wałęsa agreed to postpone the general strike.

See also
 Soviet reaction to the Polish crisis of 1980-1981

References

External links 
A photo of the strike in the Nowy Sacz Shoe Factory "Podhale"
A Solidarity poster of the strike, with inscription "The truth will win"

1981 labor disputes and strikes
1981 in Poland
Anti-communism in Poland
Labor disputes in Poland
March 1981 events in Europe
Protests in Poland
Solidarity (Polish trade union)